The Kingdom of Rwanda was a kingdom in East Africa which grew to be ruled by a Tutsi monarchy. It was one of the oldest and the most centralized kingdom in the Central and East Africa region. It was later annexed under German and Belgian colonial rule while retaining some of its autonomy.  The Tutsi monarchy was abolished in 1961 after ethnic violence erupted between the Hutu and the Tutsi during the Rwandan Revolution which started in 1959. After a 1961 referendum, Rwanda became a Hutu-dominated republic and received its independence from Belgium in 1962.

After the revolution, the last ruling monarch, Kigeli V, was exiled and he eventually settled in the United States. A court in exile has been maintained outside Rwanda ever since the abolition of the monarchy. As of 9 January 2017, the current proclaimed King of Rwanda is Yuhi VI.

History 
In the 15th century, one kingdom, under King Gihanga, managed to incorporate several of its close neighbor territories establishing the Kingdom of Rwanda. The Hutu majority, 82–85% of the population, were mostly free peasants while the kings, known as Mwami, were exclusively Tutsis of the Nyiginya clan. Certainly some Hutus were nobility and, equally, considerable intermingling took place.

Before the 19th century, it was believed that the Tutsis held military leadership power while the Hutus possessed agricultural skills. 

The position of Queen Mother was an important one, managing the royal household and being heavily involved in court politics. When their sons ascended to the throne, mothers would take a new name. This would be composed of nyira-, meaning "mother of", followed by, usually, the regal name of the new king; only kings named Mutara do not follow this convention, their mothers taking the name Nyiramavugo (mother of good counsel).

As the kings centralized their power and authority, they distributed land among individuals rather than allowing it to be passed down through lineage groups, of which many hereditary chiefs had been Hutu. Most of the chiefs appointed by the Mwamis were Tutsi. The redistribution of land, enacted between 1860 and 1895 by Kigeli IV Rwabugiri, resulted in an imposed patronage system, under which appointed Tutsi chiefs demanded manual labor in return for the right of Hutus to occupy their land. This system left Hutus in a serf-like status with Tutsi chiefs as their feudal masters.

Under Mwami Rwabugiri, Rwanda became an expansionist state. Rwabugiri did not bother to assess the ethnic identities of conquered peoples and simply labeled all of them "Hutu". The title "Hutu", therefore, came to be a trans-ethnic identity associated with subjugation. While further disenfranchising Hutus socially and politically, this helped to solidify the idea that "Hutu" and "Tutsi" were socioeconomic, not ethnic, distinctions. In fact, one could kwihutura, or "shed Hutuness", by accumulating wealth and rising through the social hierarchy.

The borders of the kingdom were rounded out in the late 19th century by Kigeri IV Rwabugiri, who is regarded as Rwanda’s greatest king. By 1900, Rwanda was a unified state with a centralized military structure.

Owing to its isolation, Rwanda's engagement with the Indian Ocean slave trade was extremely limited until the end of the 19th century. The first Europeans did not arrive in Rwanda until 1894, making Rwanda one of the last regions of Africa to have been explored by Europeans. In 1897, Germany established a presence in Rwanda with the formation of an alliance with the king, beginning the colonial era.

See also
History of Rwanda
List of kings of Rwanda

References

Rwanda
1959 establishments in Rwanda
1962 disestablishments in Africa
Rwanda
Rwanda